House Creek may refer to:

House Creek (California), a stream in California
House Creek (Chattahoochee River tributary), a stream in Georgia
House Creek, Missouri, an unincorporated community
House Creek (New York), a stream in New York
House Creek (Crabtree Creek tributary), a stream in North Carolina

See also
House Creek Township, Wake County, North Carolina